Zhouzhuang (Wu: Tseu-zaon) is a town famous for its canals in Jiangsu province, China. It is located within the administrative area of Kunshan, 30 km southeast of the city centre of Suzhou.

Zhouzhuang is a popular tourist destination, classified as a AAAAA scenic area by the China National Tourism Administration.  It is one of the most famous water townships in China, noted for its profound cultural background, the well preserved ancient residential houses and the elegant watery views. It has been called the "Venice of the East".

History
In the Spring and Autumn period (770 BC–476 BC), Zhouzhuang Suzhou was a part of the fief Yaocheng and called Zhenfengli. After being donated to Full Fortune (Quanfu) Temple by Zhou Digong, a very devout Buddhist, in 1086 during the Northern Song dynasty (960–1127), Zhouzhuang got its present name.

Sights

Double Bridges (Shuang qiao)
Zhouzhuang is surrounded and divided by lakes and rivers. Many stone bridges cross the rivers, showing distinctive views of the water-town. The Double Bridges, which are Shide Bridge and Yongan Bridge, are the most famous and are considered the symbol of Zhouzhuang. Built in the Wanli era (1573–1619) of the Ming dynasty, the Double Bridges are located in the northeast of the town. Shide Bridge is east–west and has a round arch, while Yongan Bridge is north–south and has a square arch. Crossing the two crisscross rivers (Yinzi Creek and Nabeishi River) and connecting at the middle, the Twin Bridges look like an old-style Chinese key. In 1984, 38 canvases of the notable painter, Chen Yifei, were exhibited in a New York gallery of Armand Hammer, chairman of Occidental Petroleum Corporation. "Memory of Hometown", which depicted the Double Bridges, was one of the items on display and has gained the world's attention for Zhouzhuang. The painting was chosen to be the first-day cover of the United Nations' postage stamp in 1985.

Fuan Bridge
Located at the eastern end of Zhongshi Jie, Fuan Bridge was built in 1355 during the Yuan dynasty. The unique trait of the Fuan is the consummate combination of the single-arch bridge and the bridge towers.

Shenting House
Built in 1742 and located at the southeast side of Fuan Bridge, Shenting House was the private property of the descendant of Shen Wansan, the first millionaire of Jiangnan (South of Yangtze River) in the early Ming dynasty. The whole architectural complex is of the Qing's style and occupies an area of more than 2,000 square meters (half an acre). Over 100 rooms are divided into three sections and each one is connected by arcades and aisles. The first is the water gate and the wharf, where Shen's family moored boats and washed clothes. The middle part includes the gate tower, the tearoom and the main hall. Bricky gate tower carved with lively and ingenious figures which tell the historic stories or show the good wishes, make it a rare artwork. Tea room and main hall are places for serving guests, and the furnishings here are all very elegant. The last section is the two-storied dwelling which consists of several buildings which are quite different from the main hall, more comfortable and refined in pattern and atmosphere. The painted sculpture of legendary Shen Wansan is in Datang Tower; cultural relics including ancient folk instruments are exhibited in Xiaotang Tower and Back Hall.

Zhangting House
It was built by Xu's family in the Zhengtong era (1436–1449) of the Ming dynasty and bought by Zhang's family in the early Qing dynasty. Located to the south of the Double Bridges, Zhangting House has more than 70 rooms and takes up about 1,800 square meters (less than half an acre). With Ruojing River flowing through, Zhangting House is a dapper and graceful residential house; has a tranquil courtyard and pond. Deep halls all represent the life of the quondam owner.

Milou Tower
Once called the De's Tavern, Milou Tower perches next to Zhenfeng Bridge which is at the southwest corner of Zhouzhuang. It is famous for being a rallying place of the literators in old times.

Chengxu Temple

Standing on Zhongshi Street which is opposite to Puqing Bridge, Chengxu Taoist Temple was built during 1086–1093 of the Song dynasty and also known as Sanctity Hall (Shengtang Hall). After several periods of expansion, it is one of the most famous Taoist temples in Wuzhong Region. In an area of 1,500 square meters (1,800 square yards), Shengdi and Doumu halls, Yuhuang, Wenchang and Shengdi pavilions are pieces of Taoist architectures.

Local food

Wansan pork
The most famous local food of Zhouzhuang is Wansan pork hock, named after Shen Wansan, the richest man in the late Yuan and early Ming dynasty in Jiangnan.

Sanwei Glutinous rice balls 
Sanwei Glutinous rice balls are commonly called soup gluten. In the area of Jiangnan, rice balls are a delicious dish that every family would make at home.

Practicalities

Entrance and tickets
Entry fee is 100 yuan per person for a day. This ticket gives you entry to the ancient city area and all the sights noted above. Without purchasing the ticket, you cannot enter the area.
There is an organized boat ride down the narrow canal. It costs 40 yuan per head, or 100 yuan for a boat, which can be used by 1–6 people. The boat ride lasts 20 minutes. Note that the boat ride service lasts until 8pm, so you may consider a ride in the evening after the other attractions have closed. The day trip (before 4pm) and night trips (4-8pm) have different routes.

See also 
List of twin towns and sister cities in China
 Wuzhen

References

External links

 Official Zhouzhuang web site

Traditional folk houses in China
Tourist attractions in Suzhou
AAAAA-rated tourist attractions
Kunshan